Nesbert "Stix" Hooper (born August 15, 1938) is an American drummer and founding member of The Crusaders.

Career
Hooper developed an interest in music, drums, and percussion at an early age. Starting in middle school with band director George Magruder, he began devoting much of his time to the study of music. While he was a student at Wheatley High School (Houston), he formed the band the Swingsters, then the Modern Jazz Sextet. At Texas Southern University, he received coaching from members of the Houston Symphony Orchestra and other local professional musicians. After moving to the west coast, he studied music at California State University, Los Angeles and with private instructors and mentors. During the 1950s the Jazz Crusaders were formed.

He has worked with Arthur Fiedler, George Shearing,  B.B. King, Grant Green, Grover Washington Jr., Quincy Jones, Marvin Gaye, Nancy Wilson, the Royal Philharmonic Orchestra of London, and the Rolling Stones. He was National Vice Chairman of the National Academy of Recording Arts and Sciences and president of its Los Angeles chapter.

Discography

As leader
 The World Within (MCA, 1979)
 Touch the Feeling (MCA, 1982)
 Lay it on the Line (Artful Balance, 1989)
 Many Hats (Stix Hooper Enterprises, 2010)
 Mainstream Straight Ahead (Stix Hooper Enterprises, 2010)
 Jazz Gems (Stix Hooper Enterprises, 2010)

With The Crusaders
 Freedom Sound (Pacific Jazz, 1961)
 Lookin' Ahead (Pacific Jazz, 1962)
 The Jazz Crusaders at the Lighthouse (Pacific Jazz, 1962)
 Tough Talk (Pacific Jazz, 1963)
 Heat Wave (Pacific Jazz, 1963)
 Jazz Waltz (Pacific Jazz, 1963) with Les McCann
 Stretchin' Out (Pacific Jazz, 1964)
 The Thing (Pacific Jazz, 1965)
 Chile Con Soul (Pacific Jazz, 1965)
 Live at the Lighthouse '66 (Pacific Jazz, 1966)
 Talk That Talk (Pacific Jazz, 1966)
 The Festival Album (Pacific Jazz, 1966)
 Uh Huh (Pacific Jazz, 1967)
 Lighthouse '68 (Pacific Jazz, 1968)
 Powerhouse (Pacific Jazz, 1969)
 Lighthouse '69 (Pacific Jazz, 1969)
 Give Peace a Chance (Liberty, 1970)
 Old Socks New Shoes – New Socks Old Shoes (Chisa, 1970)
 Pass the Plate (Chisa, 1971)
 Hollywood (MoWest, 1972)
 Crusaders 1 (Blue Thumb, 1972)
 The 2nd Crusade (Blue Thumb, 1973)
 Unsung Heroes (Blue Thumb, 1973)
 Scratch (Blue Thumb, 1974)
 Southern Comfort (Blue Thumb, 1974)
 Chain Reaction (Blue Thumb, 1975)
 Those Southern Knights (Blue Thumb, 1976)
 Free as the Wind (Blue Thumb, 1977)
 Images (Blue Thumb, 1978)
 Street Life (MCA, 1979)
 Rhapsody and Blues (MCA, 1980)
 Standing Tall (MCA, 1981)
 Royal Jam (MCA, 1982)
 Rural Renewal (Verve, 2003)

As sideman
With Joe Sample
 1978 Rainbow Seeker
 1979 Carmel
 1980 Voices in the Rain

With others
 1969 Back to the Roots, Kay Starr
 1971 The Heart and Soul of Joe Williams and George Shearing, Joe Williams and George Shearing (Sheba)
 1971 Head On, Bobby Hutcherson
 1971 Shades of Green, Grant Green
 1973 I Know I Love Him, Nancy Wilson
 1973 Playing/Singing, Larry Carlton
 1974 Light, Airy and Swinging, George Shearing
 1974 I Am Not Afraid, Hugh Masekela
 1980 Now We May Begin, Randy Crawford
 1989 Let's Stay Together, Eric Gale
 1989 Times Are Changin ', Freddie Hubbard
 2003 New York, New Sound, Gerald Wilson (Mack Avenue)

References

1938 births
Living people
Jazz musicians from Texas
Musicians from Houston
20th-century American drummers
American jazz drummers
American male drummers
Soul-jazz drummers
Hard bop drummers
Jazz-funk drummers
Crossover jazz drummers
20th-century American male musicians
American male jazz musicians
The Crusaders members